George Morris (April 1833 – 11 September 1912) was an Irish Home Rule League politician.

He was first elected as Member of Parliament (MP) for Galway Borough at a by-election in April 1867, representing the Liberals, but did not stand again in 1868. He returned to the seat in 1874, but again did not stand in 1880.

He was High Sheriff of Galway Town in 1860.

References

External links
 

1833 births
1912 deaths
High Sheriffs of Galway Town
Home Rule League MPs
Irish Liberal Party MPs
Members of the Parliament of the United Kingdom for County Galway constituencies (1801–1922)
UK MPs 1865–1868
UK MPs 1874–1880